Garfield Township is a township in Clay County, Iowa, USA.  As of the 2000 census, its population was 311.

Geography
According to the USGS, it contains one cemetery, Garfield Township.

Mud Lake is within this township.

References
 USGS Geographic Names Information System (GNIS)

External links
 US-Counties.com
 City-Data.com

Townships in Clay County, Iowa
Townships in Iowa